"Pay No Mind" is a song recorded by German Eurodance band Culture Beat. It was released in 1998 as the lead single from their fourth studio album, Metamorphosis (1998), and is also the first release featuring new singer Kim Sanders. It reached its best chart positions as number 27 in Germany and number 37 in Austria.

Music video
The music video for "Pay No Mind" was directed by Volker Hannwacker.

Track listing

Charts

References

1998 singles
Culture Beat songs
Kim Sanders songs
1998 songs
Columbia Records singles
English-language German songs
Music videos directed by Volker Hannwacker